The Massacre of the Sixty, or Black Saturday (tikuru kidami), was an execution that took place in Addis Ababa, Ethiopia commissioned by the Derg government against 60 imprisoned former government officials at Kerchele Prison  on the morning of 23 November 1974.  The prison was commonly called Alem Bekagn – "I've had enough of this world".

The Ethiopian Revolution started about ten weeks before the massacre. Before this point, the Derg was able to instill hope among the people that the revolution could remain bloodless. Epitomised by the slogan "Ityopiya tikdem, yala mimin dem” – “Ethiopia first, without any bloodshed”.

The massacre presaged the Red Terror and Ethiopian Civil War that would follow in years after.

List of people executed
The 54 below were executed on the orders of Mengistu Haile Mariam. Their names were read the following morning on Ethiopian Radio.

Executed
Prime Minister Tsehafi Taezaz Aklilu Habte-Wold
Prime Minister Lilj Endalkachew Makonnen
Lt. General Abiye Abebe
H.H. Prince (Leul Ras) Asrate Kassa
Rear Admiral Leul Iskinder Desta
Ras Mesfin Sileshi
Ato Abebe Retta
Ato Akalework Habte-Wold
Lt. Colonel Tamirat Yigezu
Dejazmatch Kifle Irgetu
Lt. General Kebede Gebre
Lt. General Issayas Gebre-Sellasie
Lt. General Assefa Ayana
Lt. General Debebe HaileMariam
Lt. General Belete Abebe
Lt. General Deresae Dubale
Lt. General Haile Baikedagn
Lt. General Assefa Demisse
Lt. General Abebe Gemeda
Lt. General Yilma Shibeshi
Ato Mulatu Debebe
Dr. Tesfaye Gebre Igzi
Dejazmatch Workineh Wolde Amanuel
Dejazmatch Aemero Selassie Abebe
Dejazmatch Solomon Abreha
Dejazmatch Sahelu Difeye
Dejazmatch Worku Enko Selassie
Dejazmatch Legese Bezu
Colonel Solomon Kedir
Blata Admasu Retta
Ato Nebiye Leul Kifle
Ato Solomon Gebre Mariam
Ato Tegegn Yetashework
Afe Nigus (Lord Chief Justice) Abeje Debalke
Dejazmatch Kebede Aliwele Asfaw
Major General Gashaw Kebede
Major General Seyoum Gedle Giorgis
Major General Tafesse Lemma
Lij Hailu Desta
Fitawrari Amde Abera
Fitawrari Tadesse Enko Selassie
Fitawrari Demisse Alamirew
Kegnyazmatch Yilma Aboye
Brigadier General Wondemu Abebe
Brigadier General Girma Yohannes
Brigadier General Mulugeta Wolde Yohannes
Colonel Yegazu Yemane
Colonel Alem Zewde Tessema
Colonel Tassew Mojo
Major Berhane Mecha
Captain Mola Wakene
Captain Wolde-Yohannes Zergaw
Lieutenant Belai Tsegaye

Killed in shootout
The remaining six were killed in a shootout at the home of General Aman Andom

Lieutenant Demisse Shiferaw 
Lance Corporal Bekele Wolde Giorgis
Sub-Corporal Tekle Haile
Lt. General Aman Mikael Andom
Lance Corporal Tesfaye Tekle
Junior Aircraftsman Yohannes Fetoui

References

1974 in Ethiopia
Massacres in Ethiopia
1974 murders in Africa
1974 murders in Ethiopia